American Committee for Devastated France (1919-1924) also known as C.A.R.D. (Comité Américain pour les Régions Dévastées de France), from the French translation of the name of the organization, was a small group of American women who volunteered to help the French Third Republic recover from the destruction of The Great War (later known as World War I.)

The volunteer civilian relief organization was founded by philanthropist Anne Morgan (1873–1952) and her friend Anne Murray Dike (1879–1929). Morgan's commanding personality and social status helped her rally potential volunteers and raise funds while traveling across the United States. Dike, a physician, organized field work in France. The group's efforts followed the volunteer work of the American Fund for French Wounded (1915-1919).

Morgan, youngest daughter of financier John Pierpont Morgan and his second wife, the former Frances Louisa Tracy, used photographs to document the suffering in France, a nation that provided crucial help during the American Revolution. Images of ruined communities and French refugees highlighted the human cost of war. Committee applicants had to speak French, hold a driver's license, and most had to pay their own expenses — $1,500 for a typical six-month tour of volunteer duty. Blue martial uniforms were required. They could be custom-made for $45, by B. Altman Company. Anne Morgan told potential volunteers they would face hard work and devastation. "We do not want sightseers who would like to go over for half a year to view France's battlefields," The New York Times reported. The women lived in barracks and worked long hours.

Some 350 volunteers from the American Committee for Devastated France served in France. Among them was Mary Carson Breckinridge (1881-1965). Many female physicians in the United States — an estimated 6,000 during The Great War era — wanted to serve in Europe. The military medical corps would not accept women as officers, so the committee provided an opportunity to serve. Breckinridge gained key experience in post-war Europe that helped inspire her to create the non-profit Kentucky Committee for Mothers and Babies, later known as the Frontier Nursing Service. Anna Lander West McDonnell (1876-1966), youngest child of Charles and Marguerite Rode Lander West of San Francisco, California, was already living in France at the time of the war, having moved to Paris with her husband in 1907. Widowed in 1910, owning land in France and with no children, McDonnell served as a hospital auxiliary or nurse in Bordeaux until around the start of the Great War. She returned to the United States, but went back to France in 1918 to serve the committee.

Another volunteer was future diplomat Lucile Atcherson Curtis, who was eventually transferred to Paris to become director of personnel there for the American Committee for Devastated France, and in December 1919 was given the Medaille de la Reconnaissance Francaise for her work. Established landscape architect Mary Rutherfurd Jay would also join the ranks of Morgan's Committee, commanding an agricultural unit of women who trained wounded soldiers to raise crops by seed. Jessie Carson was an American librarian who was appointed the director of children's libraries for the American Committee for Devastated France in 1918. She is credited with making lasting change in French libraries, particularly by extending services to children, who had not traditionally been served by French libraries. Lily Morehead Mebane was an American public servant and heiress who joined the committee in 1918, and was later awarded the Cross of Mercy by Peter I of Serbia and the Legion of Honour by the French government for her work with the organization.

See also
Comité des Étudiants Américains de l'École des Beaux-Arts Paris

References

External links
New York Public Library
The Morgan Library and Museum archives
University of Nevada-Reno archives
promotional poster for Comité Américain pour les Régions Dévastées de France (American Committee for Devastated France) |accessdate=2013-04-11 |publisher=Europeana

Aftermath of World War I in France
American women in World War I
France–United States relations
Humanitarian aid organizations of World War I
Non-profit organizations based in France
Organizations established in 1919
Organizations disestablished in 1924
Women's organizations based in the United States